Bhimsingh Kannan (10 January 1951 – 13 June 2020) was an Indian cinematographer who worked in Tamil and Malayalam films. He was known for his association with Director Bharathiraja and was referred to as "Bharathirajavin Kangal" (Bharathiraja's Eyes).

Personal life 
Kannan was the son of film-maker A. Bhimsingh and the younger brother of editor B. Lenin. He was married to Kanchana and  has two daughters namely MadhuMathi Kannan and Janani Kannan.

Career 
Kannan was known for his recurrent association with Bharathiraja.

Filmography

Tamil 

 Oru Nadigai Natakam Parkiral (1978)
 Nizhalgal (1980)
 Alaigal Oivathillai (1981)
 Tik Tik Tik (1981)
 Kaadhal Oviyam (1982)
 Valibamey Vaa Vaa (1982)
 Mann Vasanai (1983)
 Pudhumai Penn (1984)
 Muthal Mariyathai (1985)
 Oru Kaidhiyin Diary (1985)
 Kadalora Kavithaigal (1986)
 Vedham Pudhithu (1987)
 Kodi Parakuthu (1988)
 Solla Thudikuthu Manasu (1988)
 Soora Samhaaram (1988)
 En Uyir Thozhan (1990)
 Pudhu Nellu Pudhu Naathu (1991)
 Nadodi Thendral (1992)
 Captain Magal (1993)
 Kizhakku Cheemayile (1993)
 Karuththamma (1994)
 Priyanka (1994)
 Pasumpon (1995)
 Senathipathi (1996)
 Kadal Pookkal (2001)
 Looty (2001)
 Kangalal Kaidhu Sei (2003)
 Vishwa Thulasi (2004)
 Ayul Regai (2005)
 Uliyin Osai (2011)
 Uchithanai Muharnthaal (2011)

Malayalam 
 Rappadikalude Gatha (1978)
 Iniyaval Urangatte (1978)
 Niram Marunna Nimishangal (1982)
 Vasudha (1992)
 Oru Yathramozhi (1997)

Telugu 
 Pagadala Padava (1979)
 Kotha Jeevithalu (1981)
 Seethakoka Chiluka (1981)
 Aradhana (1987)

Hindi
White Rainbow (2005)
Final Cut of Director (2016)

Kannada
 Thugs Of Malgudi (TBA)

Awards 
He won the Shantaram Award for Best Cinematography for his work in Kadal Pookkal in 2001. He was also a recipient of the Tamil Nadu State Film Award for Best Cinematographer twice for Alaigal Oivathillai (1981) and Kangalal Kaidhu Sei (2004).

Death 
Kannan died on 13 June 2020 at the age of 69 due to heart complications.

Television

References

Tamil Nadu State Film Awards winners
Malayalam film cinematographers
Tamil film cinematographers
20th-century Indian photographers
21st-century Indian photographers
Artists from Chennai
Cinematographers from Tamil Nadu
1951 births
2020 deaths